Bruce Edward Davis II (born September 2, 1985) is an American former professional football player who was a linebacker in the National Football League (NFL). He played college football for the  UCLA Bruins and was drafted by the Pittsburgh Steelers in the third round (88th overall) of the 2008 NFL Draft. In his rookie season, he helped the Steelers defeat the Arizona Cardinals in Super Bowl XLIII.

Davis was also a member of the Oakland Raiders, and is the son of former NFL offensive tackle Bruce Davis.

Early years
Davis attended Clear Creek High School in League City, Texas. As a junior, he made 32 tackles, including eight sacks. He earned All-Greater Houston area and All-League honors after he recorded 65 tackles (50 solo), 12 quarterback sacks and 17 tackles for loss as a senior.

College career

At the University of California, Los Angeles, Davis played defensive end. He redshirted his freshman year with the Bruins in 2003. In 2004, he played in all 12 games, starting the first two contests, at defensive end. He had 17 tackles and 2.5 sacks. In 2005 Davis moved to outside linebacker from defensive end during the spring and played both positions early in the season before moving back to end due to injuries on the team. He appeared in all 12 games and his 28 tackles for the season and was tied for third on the team with two sacks and was sixth with six tackles for losses. As a junior in 2006, he was named first-team All-American by CollegeFootballNews.com and SI.com and he was selected second-team All-Pacific-10 Conference. On the year, Davis made 47 tackles, with 12.5 sacks and 17.5 tackles for loss. In 2007, he was a second-team All-American choice by The NFL Draft Report and the Walter Camp Foundation and was again second-team All-Pac-10. He was a semifinalist for the Bednarik Award and was on the watch lists for the Lott, Nagurski, Lombardi and Hendricks Awards. He started all 13 games at right defensive end, ranking tied for ninth in the nation and tied for first in the league with 12 sacks. He ranked sixth in the Pac-10 with 15.5 stops for losses. On the year he recorded 45 tackles (32 solos) caused two fumbles and recovered another and deflected nine passes and defensed 3 others.

Davis ranks second in school history with 29 quarterback sacks, topped only by Dave Ball’s 30.5 (2000–03). His 42.5 stops for losses rank third in school annals behind Ball (43.5) and Carnell Lake (45.5, 1985–88).

Professional career

Pre-draft

Pittsburgh Steelers
Davis was drafted by the Pittsburgh Steelers in the third round (88th overall) of the 2008 NFL Draft. After being drafted by the Steelers, he was converted to outside linebacker in the Steelers' 3-4 defense, though faced difficulty in the transition, as he was inactive for most of his rookie season. He was waived on September 4, 2009.

New England Patriots
Davis was signed to the New England Patriots practice squad on October 7, 2009. After spending the remainder of the season on the practice squad, he was re-signed to a future contract on January 13, 2010. The Patriots waived Davis on May 27, 2010.

Denver Broncos
Davis was claimed off waivers by the Denver Broncos on June 1, 2010. He was waived on July 27.

San Francisco 49ers
Davis was signed by the San Francisco 49ers on August 10, 2010.  On September 3, 2010, Davis was cut from the 53-player roster that would go on to play regular season games. The 49ers then re-signed him to their practice squad on September 5, 2010; he was released from his contract nine days later. He was re-signed to the practice squad on September 22.

Oakland Raiders
On October 5, 2010, the Oakland Raiders signed Davis to their active roster to help bolster the team's injury-depleted linebacker corps. He was waived a year later on October 13, 2011.

Cincinnati Bengals
On November 23, 2011, the Cincinnati Bengals signed Davis to their practice squad.

Second Stint With the 49ers
On January 3, 2012, the San Francisco 49ers signed Davis to their practice squad.

Hamilton Tiger-Cats
On August 4, 2012, Davis was signed by the Hamilton Tiger-Cats and assigned to their practice squad. On August 16, he was promoted to the active roster and started his first career game vs. Winnipeg.

References

External links
Just Sports Stats
New England Patriots bio
Pittsburgh Steelers bio
UCLA Bruins bio

1985 births
Living people
Players of American football from Los Angeles
American football linebackers
UCLA Bruins football players
Pittsburgh Steelers players
New England Patriots players
Denver Broncos players
San Francisco 49ers players
Oakland Raiders players
Hamilton Tiger-Cats players
People from League City, Texas
Sportspeople from Harris County, Texas